Karaja or Karajá may refer to:

Karajá, an indigenous tribe of Brazil
Karajá language
Karaja (singer) (born 1978), German musician 
Karaja, Iran, a village in East Azerbaijan Province, Iran